Alticola is a genus of rodent in the family Cricetidae.

Species 

Subgenus Alticola
 White-tailed mountain vole (Alticola albicauda)
 Silver mountain vole (Alticola argentatus)
 Gobi Altai mountain vole (Alticola barakshin)
 Central Kashmir vole (Alticola montosa)
 Lake Baikal mountain vole (Alticola olchonensis)
 Royle's mountain vole (Alticola roylei)
 Mongolian silver vole (Alticola semicanus)
 Stoliczka's mountain vole (Alticola stoliczkanus)
 Tuva silver vole (Alticola tuvinicus)
Subgenus Aschizomys
 Lemming vole (Alticola lemminus)
 Large-eared vole (Alticola macrotis)
Subgenus Platycranius
 Flat-headed vole (Alticola strelzowi)

References

 
Rodent genera
Taxa named by William Thomas Blanford
Taxonomy articles created by Polbot